BRD – Groupe Société Générale is a Romanian bank which is based in Bucharest, Romania. It was founded in 1923 and is currently the third largest bank by assets (about 10.9 bn €) in Romania.

The majority of shares are owned by French Société Générale financial group who holds a stake of 60.17%. It was rebranded after the Société Générale acquired Banca Română pentru Dezvoltare from the Romanian Government in 1999.

History

Foundation 
In 1923, Societatea Națională de Credit Industrial was founded as a public institution. The National Bank of Romania held the majority with 30% of the share capital.

After World War II and the Nationalization Law of June 1948, Societatea Națională de Credit Industrial was nationalized and became Banca de Credit pentru Investiții.

BRD was founded in 1990 as a commercial bank by taking over assets of the former Investment Bank of Romania.

Since 31 October 2012, the general manager of the BRD is Philippe Charles Lhotte. He replaced Alexandre Paul Maymat who stepped down due to family reasons.

In July 2013, Moody's downgraded the BRD's ratings to Ba2/Not-Prime from Baa3/Prime-3, following the lowering of the bank's baseline credit assessment (BCA) to b2 from ba3.

Controversies and legal issues 
In December 2012, the Romanian authorities opened an investigation on a $111 million fraud at BRD.

In May 2015, the Romanian authorities opened an investigation on a €43 million fraud involving Remus Truică.

Activity 

It has over 2.2 million clients, more than 900 branches and recently moved its headquarters into a new building on Victoriei Square in the north side of Bucharest, into one of the tallest towers in the country .

References

External links

 

Société Générale
Banks of Romania
Companies based in Bucharest
Companies listed on the Bucharest Stock Exchange
Banks established in 1923
1999 mergers and acquisitions